Ozothamnus occidentalis (common name rough-leaved everlasting) is a shrub in the family Asteraceae (the daisy family), native to Western Australia. 

The species was first described as Helichrysum occidentale in 1958 by Nancy Burbidge, and was transferred to the genus, Ozothamnus in 1991, by Arne Anderberg.

References

External links
 Ozothamnus occidentalis: occurrence data at Atlas of Living Australia

occidentalis
Asterales of Australia
Flora of Western Australia
Plants described in 1958